Labyrinth of Lies is the 31st installment in the Nancy Drew point-and-click adventure game series by Her Interactive.  The game is available for play on Microsoft Windows and Mac OS X platforms. It has an ESRB rating of E10+ for moments of mild violence and peril. Players take on the first-person view of fictional amateur sleuth Nancy Drew and must solve the mystery through interrogation of suspects, solving puzzles, and discovering clues. There are two levels of gameplay, Amateur and Master sleuth modes, each offering a different difficulty level of puzzles and hints, however neither of these changes affect the actual plot of the game.  This game is loosely based upon the book The Greek Symbol Mystery.

Plot
Melina Rosi, the curator of the Phidias Cultural Center in Greece, hires Nancy Drew to assist with the museum's most anticipated event of the year. Persephone in Winter, a play about the myth of Persephone, is being performed in the amphitheater to drum up publicity for the new Life in Ancient Greece exhibit. However, artifacts from the exhibit are mysteriously disappearing. Are these mishaps connected to the amphitheater's upcoming performance, or is an unseen villain pulling strings behind the scenes?

Development

Characters
Nancy Drew (Lani Minella) - Nancy is an 18-year-old amateur detective from the fictional town of River Heights in the United States. She is the only playable character in the game, which means the player must solve the mystery from her perspective.
Xenia Doukas (Julia Stockton) - Playing the lead role in the performance of Persephone in Winter, Xenia is a talented actress who is also the show's director. She keeps busy with her work on the play, but is her sweet personality and demanding workload blinding Xenia from what's truly going on behind the scenes? Or is her obsession with being a great actress masking her true intentions?
Niobe Papadaki (Katherine Grant-Suttie) - Niobe plays the role of Demeter, Persephone's mother, but she is also the show's prop and stage artist. She has a strong interest in the museum's artifacts and is referencing the pieces for onstage props and design. Terrified of being onstage, Niobe tends to keep to herself and focuses on her work. But has Niobe been observing more than just artwork? Could she possibly shed some light on her other observations at the museum? 
Thanos Ganas (Beau Prichard) - Hades, Greek god of the underworld, is large and intimidating, much like the actor who portrays him. Thanos lingers under the set, keeping an eye on all the stage hydraulics and making sure that the sets are working properly. He doesn't like anyone snooping under the stage and is very protective of the set. Is there more to reveal in the Underworld than Thanos is letting on?
Grigor Karakinos (Jeff Pierce) - Cast as Hermes the Messenger, Grigor is also the stage manager and technician for the play. He works backstage with the lights, lifts, and other various stage assets. Charming and talkative, Grigor seems to know everyone and everything that's going on. He may be helpful for picking up interesting information, but is he holding anything back?
Melina Rosi (Billie Wildrick) - The curator of the museum, Melina Rosi, has called you in to assist with the exhibit in time for the grand opening and upcoming play. Her museum staff are mysteriously abandoning their roles. However, Melina is undeterred and will do whatever it takes to hunt down the truth. No one is closer to the artifacts than Melina, but could she be hiding her true involvement in the missing exhibit pieces?
Frank Hardy (Jonah Von Spreekin) & Joe Hardy (Rob Jones) - Returning as phone contacts, the Hardy Boys are available to help you with your case. They can provide vital information regarding Greek myths and can shed additional light on the actors and the museum.

Release
The game was released on October 14, 2014, though pre-orders began on September 9, 2014.

References

 
   
 

2014 video games
Detective video games
Video games based on Nancy Drew
Point-and-click adventure games
Video games set in Greece
Windows games
MacOS games
Her Interactive games
Video games developed in the United States
Single-player video games
North America-exclusive video games
Video games based on Greek mythology